Sean O'Keefe is an American record producer, mixer, and engineer based in Chicago, Illinois, United States. O'Keefe is best known for his work with Fall Out Boy, Hawthorne Heights, Til Morning and Plain White T's, but has also worked with artists such as Motion City Soundtrack, The Hush Sound, Less Than Jake, Company of Thieves, Punchline, Spitalfield, and You vs Yesterday. O'Keefe is also a musician. He is a former member of Chicago band This Is Me Smiling and Danny and The Ketchups, in both of which he played the drums.

Commercial success
Sean's work has earned him three RIAA Gold Records (awarded for the shipment of 500,000 units): Fall Out Boy's Take This to Your Grave (producer and mixer,) Hawthorne Heights' The Silence in Black and White (producer and mixer,) and the Plain White T's Hey There Delilah (co-producer and mixer.) "Hey There Delilah" reached #1 on US Billboard Hot AC/Top 40 charts.

Selected production discography

References

External links
 "I Was A Teenage Fall Out Boy" by Patrick Stump (10 Year Anniversary of Take This To Your Grave)

Year of birth missing (living people)
Living people
Record producers from Illinois
American drummers
New Trier High School alumni